The Journal of Educational and Behavioral Statistics is a peer-reviewed academic journal published by SAGE Publications on behalf of the American Educational Research Association and American Statistical Association. It covers statistical methods and applied statistics in the educational and behavioral sciences. The journal was established in 1976 as the Journal of Educational Statistics and obtained its current name in 1994. The journal's editor is Steven Andrew Culpepper.

Mission Statement 
The Journal of Educational and Behavioral Statistics (JEBS) provides an outlet for papers that are original and useful to those applying statistical approaches to problems and issues in educational or behavioral research. Typical papers will present new methods of analysis. In addition, critical reviews of current practice, tutorial presentations of less well known methods, and novel applications of already-known methods will be published. Papers discussing statistical techniques without specific educational or behavioral interest will have lower priority.

Abstracting and indexing 
Journal of Educational and Behavioral Statistics is abstracted and indexed in, among other databases, SCOPUS and the Social Sciences Citation Index. According to the Journal Citation Reports, the journal has a 2017 impact factor of 2.233.

Editors-in-chief
The following is a list of the people who have recently been the editor-in-chief of Journal of Educational and Behavioral Statistics:
 Steven Culpepper
 Li Cai
 Daniel McCaffrey
 Sandip Sinharay
 Matthew Johnson
 David Rindskopf
 David Thissen
 Howard Wainer

References

External links
 

Education journals
Statistics journals
American Statistical Association academic journals
SAGE Publishing academic journals
Bimonthly journals
English-language journals
Publications established in 1976
Mathematical and statistical psychology journals
Psychology journals associated with learned and professional societies